Enrique Cirules (1938 – 18 December 2016) was a Cuban writer and essayist. He was born in Nuevitas, Camagüey Province.

Biography
Among his best known works are Conversation with the last American (1973), a non-fiction novel about the establishing, rise and fall of an American city in Cuba,  The Other War (short stories, 1980), The Saga of La Gloria City (novel, 1983) and Bluefields (novel, 1986). His most famous work is Mafia in Havana (El Imperio de La Habana) which won the Casa de Las Américas Prize for literature in 1993 and the Literary Critic's Award in 1994. Ernest Hemingway in the Romano Archipelago won a mention at the Casa de Las Américas in 1999. His most recent works are The Secret life of Meyer Lansky in Havana (2004 and 2006) and Santa Clara Santa (2006).

Cirules died on 18 December 2016 at the age of 78.

References 

Alfredo Schulte-Bockholt :The Politics of Organized Crime and the Organized Crime of Politics. Pg. 222 

1938 births
2016 deaths
People from Nuevitas
Cuban male novelists
Non-fiction writers about organized crime in the United States
Cuban essayists
Male essayists